

The Sobradinho Reservoir is a large reservoir located in Sobradinho, north of the Brazilian state of Bahia. The lake encloses the waters of the São Francisco River, one of the largest and most important rivers in Brazil.

The reservoir, which represents 60.4% of the hydroelectric power resources of the Northeast of Brazil, has conditions to guarantee the power supply for the region for two years but its water level is highly variable. In some drought years the energy supply is threatened.

External links 
  Lago Artificial de Sobradinho
  Sobradinho lock
  Hidrovia de São Francisco
  Official site of city of Sobradinho, Bahia

Reservoirs in Brazil
1982 establishments in Brazil
Landforms of Bahia

bpy:সোব্রাডিনহো
ro:Sobradinho